Rockville is a census-designated place and in Clarke County, Alabama, United States. Its population was 47 as of the 2020 census.

Demographics

References

Census-designated places in Clarke County, Alabama
Census-designated places in Alabama